Washington Unified School District (WUSD) is a school district headquartered in West Sacramento, California.

It was named after the former settlement of Washington, which later incorporated as West Sacramento in 1987. The district originated from the Washington Grammar School that opened in 1917.

Schools
 Secondary
 River City High School
 K-8 schools
 Bridgeway Island
 Elkhorn
 Riverbank
 Southport
 Stonegate
 Westfield
 Westmore Oaks

References

External links
 Washington Unified School District
School districts in California
School districts in Yolo County, California